Beldringe is a manor house and estate located four kilometres southwest of Præstø, Vordingborg Municipality, Denmark. The estate was from 1774 to 1993 owned by members of the Raben/Raben-Levetzau family. The two-storey main building from 1561 and a large, half-timbered barn from the 1710s were listed on the Danish registry of protected buildings and places in 1918.

History

Early history

The first known owner of  Beldringe was Joseph Nielsen Blade in 1360. The ownership of the estate is then unclear until 1522 when it was acquired by Joachim Beck (ca. 1500–72) through his marriage to Anne Ravensberg who had inherited it after her parents. In 1537, Beck was appointed as royal treasurer (rentemester) of Eastern Denmark. He was in the same time granted considerable holdings of land on Zealand and was therefore able to expand Beldringe with nine additional tenant farms.

Joachim Beck was also the owner of Førslevgaard. Joachim Beck's son Lauge Beck  (c. 1530-1607), inherited Beldringe and Gørslevgaard after his father's death in 1572. After Lauge Beck's death in 1607, Beldringe passed to his son Jacob Beck while  Førslevgaard went to his other son Sivert Beck (1566-1623).

1521–1774: Royal ownership
 
In 1621, Jacob Beck ceded Beldringe to Christian IV in exchange for Gladsaxe in Scania. Christian IV's interest in the estate was due to its location in the middle of one of his hunting grounds. At this point, Beldringe consisted of the manor and a total of 52 tenant farms. In 1622, Christian IV placed the land that had belonged to Beldringe Rectory as well as 32 tenant farms from the Fief of Tryggevælde under Beldringe. He also renovated the main building and constructed a new stable for his horses as well as new farm buildings.

In his will of 1665, Frederick III bequeathed Vordingborg Castle and the manors of Beldringe and Lekkende to his youngest son, Prince George. After Prince George's death in 1708, all his holdings reverted to the Crown and was then included in the newly established Vordingborg Cavalry District.

1774–1993: The Raben-Levetzau family
 
In 1769, it was decided to sell Vordingborg Cavalry District. A commission proposed to divide the manors into smaller parcels and sell them in public auction. These plans were, however, met with opposition. In 1774, Beldringe was instead sold to Frederik Sophus Raben (1745–1820). He undertook a comprehensive refurbishment of the main building. Raben's son, Carl Vilhelm Raben (1789-1870), inherited Beldringe after his father's death in 1820. He had served as a diplomat in the Hague for many years but returned to Denmark to manage his estate. In 1834, he was granted royal permission to assume the surname Raben-Levetzau.

Having no children, Carl Vilhelm Raben-Levetzau and his wife Julia Adelaide Harriet Bornemann established Den Raben-Levetsauske Fond. After Julia Adelaide Harriet Bornemann's death in 1888, Beldringe passed to the nephew Frederik Christoffer Otto Raben-Levetzau (1850-1933). He owned it until his death. He began his career in the foreign diplomacy but was in 1905 appointed as Minister of Foreign Affairs in the Cabinet of Prime Minister Jens Christian Christensen. In 1908, he handed in his resignation and retired from politics.
Frederik Christoffer Otto Raben-Levetzaus was succeeded on the estate by his son Johan Otto Raben-Levetzau. It was passed to his daughter in 1992. She sold it in 1993.

Architecture
The two storey main building is from 1561. It is constructed in red brick with bands of partly white-washed limestone. It stands on a foundation of field stones and has a base of finely cut granite ashlars.

Most of the farm buildings were destroyed in a fire in 1910. The most notable exception is a large, half-timbered barn from 1715. The barn is 30 bays long and 14 bays wide. The main building and the half-timbered barn were listed on the Danish registry of protected buildings and places in 1918. The scope of the heritage listing was expanded in 1990. Most of the other farm buildings date from after the fire. The entrance to the complex is marked by a gatehouse.

Today
Beldringe is today owned by Beldringe Gods ApS.

The harvest festival scene in the Academy Award-winning 1876 film Pelle the Conqueror was filmed at Beldringe.

List of owners
 (1360) Joseph Nielsen Blad 
 (1421) Tage Josephsen Blad 
 (1457) Anders Jensen Basse 
 (1473) Morten Andersen Basse 
 ( -1512) Jakob Jepsen 
 (1512-1522) Anne Jacobsdatter Ravensberg, gift Beck 
 (1522-1572) Joachim Beck 
 (1572- ) Albert Joachimsen Beck 
 ( -1607) Lauge Beck 
 (1607-1621) Jacob Lavesen Beck 
 (1621-1670) The Crown
 (1670-1708) Prince George of Denmark
 (1708-1774) Kronen 
 (1774-1820) Frederik Sophus Raben 
 (1820-1870) Carl Vilhelm Raben-Levetzau 
 (1870-1888) Julia Adelaide Harriet Bornemann, gift Raben-* Levetzau*  
 (1888-19* 31) Frederik Christopher Otto Raben-Levetzau 
 (1931-1992) Johan Otte Raben-Levetzau 
 (1992-1993) Nina Veronika Raben-Levetzau 
 (1993- )  Beldringe Gods ApS

References

Related reading
Stilling, Niels Peter (2014) Danmarks Herregårde. Sjælland, Møn og Lolland-Falster (Gyldendal) 

Manor houses in Vordingborg Municipality
Listed buildings and structures in Vordingborg Municipality
Listed castles and manor houses in Denmark
Houses completed in 1561
Prince George of Denmark